Ngô Thị Ngọc Dao (1421 - 1496) posthumous name Quang-thục Trinh-huệ Khiêm-tiết Hòa-xung Nhơn-thánh Dowager Empress (光淑禎惠謙節和沖仁聖皇太后), was a queen consort of Later Lê dynasty and mother of the Vietnamese emperor Lê Thánh Tông.

Biography
Consort Ngô Thị Bính was born in 1041 at Đồng Phang village, An Định district, Thanh Hoa prefect. She was a daughter of one countryside teacher (吳生徒) and his first wife Đinh Thị Ngọc Kế. Her mother was born at Phúc Lộc village, Thụy Nguyên district, Thanh Hoa prefect; she had been suicidal and the court gifted four gold scripts "Tiết-liệt phong-cao" (節烈風高). Lady Ngô Thị Bính has a younger brother who has no name in historical documents.

She met Lê Thái Tông on 16 July 1434 at Đồng Phang pagoda when he was incognito. She entered Lê dynasty's palace about 1435 and born prince Lê Hạo on 20 July 1442 at Dục Khánh pagoda.

Family
 Duke Ngô Kinh (興國公 吳京, ? - ?): interior grandfather, so servant of Lê Khoáng.
 Dowager Đinh Thị Mại (興國夫人 丁氏賣, ? - ?): interior grandmother.
 Dowager Trần Thị Ngọc Huy (陳氏玉徽, ? - ?): exterior grandmother, so descendant of Trần dynasty's prince Trần Nhật Duật.
 Duke Ngô Từ (懿國公 吳徐, 1370–1453): older uncle and foster father, so servant of Lê Thái Tổ who was a son of Lê Khoáng.
 Dowager Đinh Thị Ngọc Kế (懿國太夫人 丁氏玉繼, ? - ?): mother.
 Consort Ngô Thị Ngọc Xuân (吳氏玉春, ? - ?): older sister, so Lê Thái Tổ's concubine.
 Duke Ngô Khế (清國公 吳契, 1426–1514): younger brother.
 Prince Lê Nguyên Long (黎元龍, 1423–1442): husband, so emperor Lê Thái Tông.
 Grand Princess Lê Thị Ngọc Tú (安國長公主 黎氏玉繡, ? - ?): daughter.
 Prince Lê Hạo (黎灝, 1442–1497): son, then became emperor Lê Thánh Tông.

References

 Nguyễn Quyết Thắng & Nguyễn Bá Thế, Từ điển nhân vật lịch sử Việt Nam, Nhà xuất bản Khoa học Xã hội, Hà Nội, 1992.
 Nguyễn Khắc Thuần & Lý Thị Mai, Lần giở trước đèn, Nhà xuất bản Thanh Niên, Hà Nội, 2003.
 Đại Việt sử ký toàn thư chap 2, Nhà xuất bản Khoa học Xã hội, Hà Nội, 1985.
 Lê Quý Đôn, Đại Việt thông sử, Nhà xuất bản Khoa học Xã hội, Hà Nội, 1978.
 Tư liệu về Quang Thục hoàng thái hậu qua bia lăng Khôn Nguyên Chí Đức
 Đôi điều quanh tấm bia độc nhất vô nhị Việt Nam
 Truyện đất tổ Đồng Phang
 Những truyền thuyết dòng Đồng Phang

1421 births
1496 deaths
People from Thanh Hóa province
Lê dynasty empresses dowager
15th-century Vietnamese women